Filippo Forò (born 22 December 1987) is an Italian footballer who plays as a midfielder for Sangiustese.

Career 
Born in Civitanova Marche, Marche, Forò started his career at Marche team Fermana. In mid-2006 he was signed by Sambenedettese along with Giacomo Tulli. In January 2009, Forò (€150,000), along with 3 other players, namely Mattia Evangelisti (€100,000), Gianmarco Piccioni  (€100,000) and German Pomiro (€100,000) were sold to Serie B club Vicenza. The Marche club got Stefano Pietribiasi and Marco Zentil in exchange, for €300,000 in total. The two clubs also retained 50% registration rights on 6 players. Forò signed a -year contract and also returned to San Benedetto for the rest of season. The co-ownership deals were renewed except Evangelisti and Zentil in June 2009. However Sambenedettese soon bankrupted and Vicenza bought back Zentil, Pietribiasi as well as signing Tulli on free transfer.

Forò only able to play twice in 2009–10 Serie B. In mid-season he returned to Italian third division for Perugia along with Giampietro Perrulli and Orlando Urbano. Vicenza also signed Fabio Gatti in exchange.

During the 2010–11 season he was loaned to Mezzocorona, joining former Vicenza team-mate Ivan Reali. On 31 August 2011 he was signed by another third division club Triestina, and Vicenza also signed Marco Franceschin and Davide Bariti.

References

External links 
 
 Football.it Profile 

Italian footballers
Fermana F.C. players
A.S. Sambenedettese players
L.R. Vicenza players
A.C. Perugia Calcio players
A.C. Mezzocorona players
U.S. Triestina Calcio 1918 players
Vis Pesaro dal 1898 players
A.S.D. Città di Giulianova 1924 players
Serie B players
Serie C players
Serie D players
Association football midfielders
Sportspeople from the Province of Macerata
1987 births
Living people
A.S.D. Termoli Calcio 1920 players
Footballers from Marche
A.C. Sangiustese players